"Brandy (You're a Fine Girl)" is a 1972 song by American pop rock band Looking Glass from their debut album, Looking Glass. It was written by Looking Glass lead guitarist and co-vocalist Elliot Lurie.

The single reached number one on both the Billboard Hot 100 and Cash Box Top 100 charts, remaining in the top position for one week. It reached number two on the former chart for four weeks, behind Gilbert O'Sullivan's "Alone Again (Naturally)", before reaching number one, only to be dethroned by "Alone Again (Naturally)" the week after. Billboard ranked it as the No. 12 song for 1972.

Meaning
The lyrics tell of Brandy, a barmaid in a busy seaport harbor town which serves "a hundred ships a day." Though lonely sailors flirt with her, she pines for one who has long since left her because he claimed his life, his love, and his lady, was “the sea.”

The urban myth that Brandy was based on Mary Ellis (1750–1828), a spinster in New Brunswick, New Jersey, has been refuted by Lurie himself.

Lurie was thrilled with the deeper meaning given to the song when its lyrics were used as a metaphor by a father explaining his life's choices to his son in the film Guardians of the Galaxy Vol. 2, which came out in 2017.

Release
In February 1972, Robert Mandel was the Epic Records Promotion Manager in Washington, D.C. He received a test pressing of an album by Looking Glass, then a new group. He took the test pressing around to every radio station in the Washington/Baltimore region. At the time, WPGC AM/FM was one of the leading Top 40 stations in the country and was the number one radio station in DC. Harv Moore was the Program Director. He put the song into a one-hour rotation for two days and as Moore related at the time, "the switchboard lit up like a Christmas tree". He said that he had never received a response like that on a record in his 15 years in radio. Based on the airplay at WPGC and all the other Top 40 stations that followed, Epic rush-released the single of "Brandy". Based on requests alone, two weeks later, when the single finally hit the stores, "Brandy" was the number one record in DC without a single copy yet sold. Other stations around the country started playing it and it ended up being a number one million seller.  A year later when Moore celebrated his 10th Anniversary at WPGC, Looking Glass returned the favor and played at the bash the station held in his honor.

Influence
Following the song's release in 1972, "Brandy" increased in popularity as a girl's name in the United States. According to data from the Social Security Administration, Brandy was the 353rd most popular name in 1971, 140th in 1972, and, in 1973 (the first full year after the song's popularity), 82nd.

Barry Manilow's 1974 "Mandy" was a cover of a song originally titled "Brandy", released in February 1972 by Scott English; however, Manilow changed the title following the success of the Looking Glass single, so as not to get the two songs confused.

Paul Stanley of the rock band KISS wrote that "Brandy" helped inspire the band's 1976 hit "Hard Luck Woman" in his 2014 memoir Face the Music: A Life Exposed.

The 2005 song "Same Old 45" by Sarah Borges, from the album Silver City, retells the story of Brandy from her point of view.

Cover versions
 Ray Conniff and His Singers covered the song on the 1972 album Alone Again (Naturally).
 Washboard Jungle often performs this song as an encore, and recorded it on their 1994 album The Wash Cycle. They play it considerably faster than the original.
 Mick Thomas and The Sure Thing covered the song in 1999 on the album Dead Set Certainty: Twelve Songs That Wouldn't Go Away... 
 Red Hot Chili Peppers performed a cover version of the song on their Red Hot Chili Peppers Live in Hyde Park album and during their 2004 tour. They again performed it in May 2017 for the first time in twelve years.
 Kenny Chesney performed a cover version for the Target Bonus Tracks on his 2005 album The Road and the Radio.
 Gonzalez performed a cover of this song released as a single on the EMI label. 
 Big Head Todd and the Monsters released a cover on YouTube as part of their Monster's Monthly Music series.
 Local H included a cover of the song as part of their Awesome Quarantine Mixtape #3. "
 Joshua Lee Turner covered the song together with his "Back of the Bus Band" as part of his Among Friends YouTube series. "

Personnel
Elliot Lurie—Guitars, vocals
Larry Gonsky—Keyboards, vocals  
Peter Sweval—Bass, vocals, cowbell 
Jeff Grob—Drum kit
Larry Fallon—Horns arrangements

Chart performance

Weekly charts

Year-end charts

Certifications

References

External links
Official Animated Music Video

Billboard Hot 100 number-one singles
Cashbox number-one singles
RPM Top Singles number-one singles
1972 debut singles
American soft rock songs
1972 songs
Epic Records singles
Looking Glass (band) songs